Cercospora atrofiliformis is a fungal plant pathogen.

References

atrofiliformis
Fungal plant pathogens and diseases